Jadabpur Union is a union parishad of Maheshpur Upazila, in Jhenaidah District, Khulna Division of Bangladesh. There are 14 villages and 12 mouzas in the union.

References

External links
 

Unions of Khulna Division
Unions of Maheshpur Upazila
Unions of Jhenaidah District